HMS Grace was one of 11 Thames sailing barges that the Admiralty purchased in 1794 for the British Royal Navy. After the outbreak of the French Revolutionary Wars the Navy found itself without vessels capable of inshore work and riverine operations. In 1795 the Admiralty started to order purpose-built schooner or brigantine-rigged gun vessels.

Mr. G. Garnault commissioned Grace in October 1796. His replacement was Mr. W. Goodall. In June 1798 Mr. Edward Dawson took command.

The meal included the imbibing of much wine, and a disagreement developed between Miller and Dawson. Dawson left New Betsey and landed on the beach. When Miller stepped out of a boat to help the ladies disembark, Dawson came up and using his hanger, stabbed Miller, killing him. Dawson's trial took place 25 July at Maidstone, where the jury quickly found him guilty of murder. Dawson was hanged on 27 July on Penenden Heath.

The "Principal Officers and Commissioners of His Majesty's Navy" offered Grace, of 69 tons (bm), for sale on 24 October 1798. She sold then.

Citations and references
Citations

References
 
 

Ships of the Royal Navy
1794 Admiralty purchase Thames sailing barges